Holmwood is an unincorporated community in Calcasieu Parish, Louisiana, United States.

References

Unincorporated communities in Calcasieu Parish, Louisiana
Unincorporated communities in Louisiana
Unincorporated communities in Lake Charles metropolitan area